Ulnocarpal ligament may refer to:

 Dorsal ulnocarpal ligament
 Palmar ulnocarpal ligament